Heimrich (Heimo) (740-5 May 795), Count in the Upper Rheingau (Oberrheingau), son of Cancor, Count of Hesbaye, and Angila.  Heinrich was also Count of Lahngau, and lay abbot of Mosbach Abbey.

Heimrich was a leader in the forces of Charlemagne in his prosecution of the Saxon Wars and was killed in the Battle of Lüne and the Elbe fighting the Obotrite Slavs.

Heinrich married Eggiwiz of an unknown family.  They had two children:
 Heimrich (765-812), Count of Saalgau
 Bubo of Grabfeldgau (763-795)
Heimrich was the grandfather of Poppo of Grapfeld  through his son and namesake, and therefore an early member of the House of Babenberg.

Sources 

 Reuter, Timothy (trans.), The Annals of Fulda, Manchester Medieval series, Ninth-Century Histories, Volume II,  Manchester University Press, Manchester, 1992.

Medieval Lands Project, Grafen im Wormsgau

Counts of Germany
Frankish warriors
8th-century Frankish nobility
740 births
795 deaths